Ben is a given name, either as a formal name in its own right, or as a shortened version of various given names.

Ben or BEN may also refer to:

Places
 Ben, Burkina Faso, a city
 Ben, County Westmeath, St. Feighin's, Ireland
 Ben District, Iran
 Ben, Iran, a city
 Ben, Ohio, US
 Ben is Gaelic for "mountain", as in Ben Nevis and other mountains and hills of Scotland and Ireland

Arts and entertainment
 Ben (German singer), Bernhard AML Blümel
 Ben (South Korean singer), Lee Eun-young (born 1991)
 The Bens, musical trio Ben Lee, Ben Folds and Ben Kweller
 Ben (film), 1972
 "Ben" (song), by Michael Jackson for the film
 Ben (Michael Jackson album), 1972
 Ben (Jorge Ben album), 1972
 Ben (Macklemore album), 2023
 "BEN" (song), 2012, by Adair Lion
 "(Ben)", a song by Avail from 4am Friday
 Ben (comic strip)
 Ben 10, TV series about cartoon character Ben Tennyson
 Ben Drowned, serial game
 Kylo Ren, born Ben Solo, in Star Wars

Business
 Ben NL, a Dutch virtual mobile network
 Bens De Luxe Delicatessen & Restaurant, Montreal, Canada
 Franklin Templeton Investments, NYSE symbol

Codes
 Benin's ISO 3-letter country code
 ben, ISO 639 alpha-3 code for the Bengali language
 Benina International Airport, Benghazi, Libya, IATA code

Other uses
 Ben (Hebrew), "son", in names
 Ben (Բ բ), the second letter of the Armenian alphabet
 BEN Television, UK channel
 BEN domain, a protein domain
 Benefactive case in grammar

See also

Behn (disambiguation)
Benjamin (disambiguation)
Benn (disambiguation)
Benny (disambiguation)
Big Ben